Fellows of the Royal Society elected in 1989.

Fellows

 Brian David Outram Anderson
 Kenneth Dawson Bagshawe
 Sir John Macleod Ball
 Adrian Peter Bird
 Roger David Blandford
 Arthur James Cain  (1921–1999)
 Mark Child
 Alwyn George Davies
 Peter Goddard
 Michael Boris Green
 Sir Robert Brian Heap
 Geoffrey Frederick Hewitt
 Derek Hull
 Julian Hunt, Baron Hunt of Chesterton
 Richard Hynes
 Michael N. G. James
 Francis Patrick Kelly
 Sir John Hartley Lawton
 Gilbert George Lonzarich
 Andrew David McLachlan
 Michael Arthur Moore
 Kim Ashley Nasmyth
 Sir Paul Nurse
 Geoffrey Alan Parker
 Robert Ladislav Parker
 Sir Richard Peto
 Warren Richard Roper
 John Martin Rowell
 Ian John Russell
 Edward Shackleton Lord Edward Arthur Alexander (1911–1994) (Statute)
 John Philip Simons
 Charles Roger Slack
 Arthur Marshall Stoneham  (1940–2011)
 Roger Christopher Thomas
 Anne Marie Treisman
 Kenneth Wade
 Patrick David Wall  (1925–2001)
 Robert Gordon Webster
 Thomas Summers West  (1927–2010)
 Sir Andrew John Wiles
 Ian Robert Young

Foreign members

 Nicole Marthe Le Douarin
 Paul Erdős  (1913–1996)
 Kenichi Fukui  (1918–1998)
 Edward B Lewis  (1918–2004)
 Barbara McClintock  (1902–1992)
 Edward Mills Purcell  (1912–1997)

References

1989
1989 in science
1989 in the United Kingdom